Kalmthout is a municipality in the Belgian province of Antwerp. The municipality comprises the villages of Kalmthout, Achterbroek, Heide, and Nieuwmoer. In 2021, Kalmthout had a population of 19,020.

In addition to Kalmthout itself, the municipality also contains the communities of Dorp-Heuvel, Heide, Achterbroek, and Nieuwmoer.

The Arboretum Kalmthout is one of Belgium's most beautiful botanical gardens. The Kalmthoutse Heide is a nature reserve of nearly  spanning the border between Belgium and the Netherlands.

Sightseeing 
The "Kalmthoutse Heide" is a big natural park in Kalmthout. It is open to the public and has more than 15 different routes that can run for tens of kilometers.

The first synagogue outside of a city in Belgium was built in 1928 on Leopoldstraat in the village of Heide. This pre-dates the Catholic church St. Jozef's and can be seen on the local walking tour. The Jewish community played an important part in local history, with the first Belgian yeshiva also being built in Heide. Many architecturally innovative villas from the community still stand and can be seen during walking tours guided by local historians.

Notable inhabitants
Peter Janssens van Kalmthout (c. 1535 - 1572), Norbertine priest, was born here
 Hector Carlier (1884-1946), industrialist and cofounder of Petrofina
 Maria Rosseels (1916-2005), journalist and writer
 Willy Vandersteen (1913-1990), Flemish comic book creator of Spike and Suzy
 Karel Bossart (1903-1975), designer of the Atlas missile
 The three members of Flemish folk and world music group Laïs are from Kalmthout.

References

External links

  Kalmthout Official website
  Scouts Kalmthout heuvel Official website
  Arboretum Kalmthout Official website

 
Municipalities of Antwerp Province
Populated places in Antwerp Province